Dejana Krsmanović (born 1989) is a politician in Serbia. She has served in the Assembly of Vojvodina since 2016 as a member of the Serbian Progressive Party.

Private career
Krsmanović has a bachelor's degree in management. She lives in Šid.

Politician

Provincial assembly
Krsmanović received the fortieth position on the Progressive Party's electoral list in the 2016 Vojvodina provincial election and was elected when the list won a majority victory with sixty-three out of 120 mandates. She was promoted to the eleventh position in the 2020 provincial election and was re-elected when the list won seventy-six mandates. In October 2020, Krsmanović was selected as chair of the assembly committee for petitions and motions. She also serves on the committee for European integration and interregional cooperation.

Municipal politics
Krsmanović appeared in the lead position on the Progressive Party's list for the Šid municipal assembly in the 2020 Serbian local elections and was elected when the list won a majority victory with twenty-eight out of thirty-nine seats. She is a member of the municipal committee on budget and finance.

References

1989 births
Living people
People from Šid
Serbian women in politics
Members of the Assembly of Vojvodina
Serbian Progressive Party politicians